Kuoch Ky  is a Cambodian politician. He belongs to Funcinpec, which is a royalist political party, and was elected to represent Prey Veng Province in the National Assembly of Cambodia in 2003. Kuoch is currently serving as the Secretary of State for Commerce and is of Chinese descent, being the son of Chinese immigrants from Jieyang. His real Chinese name: 郭基 (Guo Ji)

References

Cambodian people of Chinese descent
Members of the National Assembly (Cambodia)
FUNCINPEC politicians
Government ministers of Cambodia
Living people
Year of birth missing (living people)